The 1985 Lincolnshire County Council election was held on Thursday, 2 May 1985. The whole council of 76 members was up for election and the election resulted in the Conservative Party retaining control of the council with a majority of 2, winning 39 seats.

Results by division
Each electoral division returned one county councillor. The candidate elected to the council in each electoral division is shown in the table below.

References

1985
1985 English local elections
1980s in Lincolnshire